The Nazis: A Warning from History is a 1997 BBC documentary film series that examines Adolf Hitler and the Nazis' rise to power, their zenith, their decline and fall, and the consequences of their reign. It featured archive footage and interviews with eyewitnesses and was shown in six episodes.

Production
The series was written and produced by Laurence Rees. The historical and script consultant was Prof. Sir Ian Kershaw, who also appears briefly in the "Chaos and Consent" episode. The series was narrated by actor Samuel West. The music used over the opening credits is "Denn alles Fleisch es ist wie Gras", the second movement of Brahms' A German Requiem.

Acclaim
The Nazis: A Warning from History ranked 93rd in a list of the 100 Greatest British Television Programmes drawn up by the British Film Institute in 2000 based on votes by industry professionals.

Companion book

Episodes

References

External links
 BBC History of World War II, The Nazis is the first in this compilation of ten films
 
 

1997 British television series debuts
1997 British television series endings
1997 non-fiction books
BBC History of World War II
Peabody Award-winning television programs
BBC television documentaries about history during the 20th Century